The Battle of Kirkuk may refer to several historical battles over several conflicts:

 Battle of Kirkuk (1733) during the Ottoman–Persian War (1730–35)
 Battle of Kirkuk (1991), part of the 1991 uprisings in Iraq
 Battle of Kirkuk (2014), part of the War in Iraq (2013–2017)
 Battle of Kirkuk (2015), part of the War in Iraq (2013–2017)
 Battle of Kirkuk (2016), part of the War in Iraq (2013–2017)
 Battle of Kirkuk (2017), part of the War in Iraq (2013–2017) and 2017 Iraqi-Kurdish Conflict